Project Baikal is a quarterly peer-reviewed academic journal  published by the VostokSibAcademCenter of the Russian Academy of Architecture and Construction Sciences. It was established in 2004 and covers the fields of architecture, art, urbanism, and design.

The journal is abstracted and indexed by Scopus.

References

External links

Arts journals
Architecture journals
Urban studies and planning journals
Quarterly journals
Publications established in 2004
Multilingual journals